The year 1767 in architecture involved some significant events.

Events
 January 9 – William Tryon, governor of the Royal Colony of North Carolina, signs a contract with architect John Hawks to build Tryon Palace, a lavish Georgian style governor's mansion on the New Bern waterfront.

Buildings and structures

Buildings

 In Bath, Somerset, England, the Octagon Chapel, designed by Timothy Lightholder or Lightoler, is completed and Royal Crescent, designed by John Wood, the Younger, is begun.
 St Helen's House, Derby, England, designed by Joseph Pickford, is completed.
 Walton Hall, West Yorkshire, England, is built.
 Auchincruive house in Scotland, based on designs by Robert Adam, is completed.
 Cliveden (Benjamin Chew House) in Germantown, Philadelphia, designed by William Peters, is completed.
 Elmwood (Cambridge, Massachusetts) is built about this date.
 In New Haven, Connecticut, the John Pierpont house (the modern-day Yale University Visitor Center) is built.
 Church of St Catherine in the Yakimanka District of central Moscow, designed by Karl Blank, is completed.
 Holy Mother of God Cathedral, Vagharshapat, Armenia, is built.
 Mühlstraße Evangelical church in Jeckenbach in the Rhineland, perhaps designed by Philipp Heinrich Hellermann, is built.
 The circular Kilarrow Parish Church in Bowmore on Islay in Scotland is built.
 In Kórnik, Poland, a wooden synagogue is built.
 Old Brick Church (New York City), designed by John McComb, Sr, is built.
 The first church in Salem, New York, is built.
 The Birchwood Inn in Lenox, Massachusetts (The Berkshires), is built.
 Arg of Karim Khan citadel in Shiraz, Persia, is completed.
 Refsnes Gods pleasure pavilion on the Norwegian island of Jeløy is built.
 Burton Pynsent Monument in Somerset, England, designed by Capability Brown, is erected.
 Temple of Harmony garden folly at Halswell House, Somerset, England, designed by Thomas Prowse, is built.

Births
 April 6 – Alexandre-Vincent Pineux Duval, French dramatist, sailor, architect, actor and theatre manager (died 1842)
 Richard Morrison, Irish architect (died 1849?)
 William Saunders, American builder (died 1861)

Deaths
 December 9 – Benedetto Alfieri, Italian architect (born 1699)
 Georges Vallon, French architect (born 1688)

References

Architecture
Years in architecture
18th-century architecture